Dhaifallah Al-Qarni (born 6 November 1988) is a Saudi Arabian professional footballer who plays as a midfielder for FD League side Al-Ain.

Honours
Al-Batin
MS League: 2019–20

References

External links 
 

1988 births
Living people
Saudi Arabian footballers
Al-Mujazzal Club players
Ohod Club players
Al-Fayha FC players
Al Batin FC players
Al-Ain FC (Saudi Arabia) players
Saudi Second Division players
Saudi First Division League players
Saudi Professional League players
Association football midfielders